The 2018 International Rhodes Grand Prix was the 2nd edition of the International Rhodes Grand Prix road cycling one day race. It was part of UCI Europe Tour in category 1.2.

Teams
Sixteen teams were invited to take part in the race. These included one UCI Professional Continental team, fourteen UCI Continental teams and one national team.

Result

References

2018 UCI Europe Tour
2018 in Greek sport